Elmira Township may refer to the following places in the United States:

 Elmira Township, Stark County, Illinois
 Elmira Township, Michigan
 Elmira Township, Minnesota

Township name disambiguation pages